Antheraea rosieri is a moth of the family Saturniidae first described by Lambertus Johannes Toxopeus in 1940. It is found in Sumatra, Peninsular Malaysia and Borneo.

External links

Antheraea
Moths of Asia
Taxa named by Lambertus Johannes Toxopeus